Anyar is a Malayalam language fiīlm of India. It was released on 19 September 2003. The film deals with the hot topic of communal polarisation in Kerala. The film stars Jyothirmayi and Biju Menon

Plot 
Sooraj and Razia are college mates. Some incidents make them fall for each other and both of them end up spending the night together. After that, they start facing social problems because of their different religions. Razia becomes a journalist and Sooraj becomes a film maker. At one point, both of them break up and Razia, who arrives at Sooraj's house to apologize, is shocked to see Sooraj making out with another girl. After some years both of them get reunited.

Cast 
Jyothirmayi as Raziya 
Biju Menon as Sooraj 
Lal as Raghavan 
Rati Agnihotri as Kamala

References

2003 films
2000s Malayalam-language films
Films directed by Lenin Rajendran
Films scored by Mohan Sithara